The Estonia national under-19 football team represents Estonia in international under-19 football and is controlled by the Estonian Football Association (Eesti Jalgpalli Liit), the governing body for football in Estonia. The team's home ground is the A. Le Coq Arena in Tallinn, and the current manager is Alo Bärengrub.

Estonia qualified as hosts to the 2012 UEFA European Under-19 Championship, making it Estonia's first appearance in a major tournament and the first major football tournament to be held in the country. The team failed to get past the group stage, losing all three matches against Portugal, Greece and Spain.

Coaching staff

Players

Current squad
 The following players were called up for the friendly matches.
 Match dates: 16 and 18 November 2022
 Opposition: Caps and goals correct as of:' 27 September 2022, after the match against .

Previous squads
UEFA European Under-19 Championship
UEFA Euro 2012 squad

Competitive record
UEFA European Under-19 ChampionshipDraws include knockout matches decided on penalty kicks.''

Under-19 Baltic Cup

See also
Estonia national football team
Estonia national under-23 football team
Estonia national under-21 football team
Estonia national under-17 football team
Estonia national youth football team

References

External links
  

 
 

under-19
European national under-19 association football teams